Sedella congdonii is a species of flowering plant in the family Crassulaceae known by the common name Congdon's mock stonecrop. It is endemic to California, where it can be found in the Sierra Nevada, often in rocky and moist habitat types. It is an annual herb growing just a few centimeters high. The oval succulent leaves are just a few millimeters long. The flowers occur in a cyme on thin branches. Each has yellow petals no more than 3 millimeters long.

References

External links
Jepson Manual Treatment
USDA Plants Profile
Photo gallery

Crassulaceae
Endemic flora of California
Flora without expected TNC conservation status